Jim Lewis (born 1963, in Cleveland, Ohio, raised in New York and London) is an American novelist.  

He has published four novels, Sister (published by Graywolf in 1993), Why the Tree Loves the Ax (published by Crown in 1998), and The King is Dead (published by Knopf in 2003).  All three have been published in the UK as well, and individually translated into several languages, including French, Norwegian, Portuguese, and Greek.  His fourth novel, entitled Ghosts of New York, was published by WVU Press in April, 2021.

In addition to his novels, he has written extensively on the visual arts, for dozens of magazines, from Artforum and Parkett to Harper's Bazaar; and contributed to 30 artist monographs, for museums around the world, among them, Richard Prince at The Whitney Museum of American Art, Jeff Koons at the San Francisco Museum of Modern Art, Christopher Wool at The Los Angeles Museum of Art, and a Larry Clark retrospective at the Musee d’Art Moderne de la Ville de Paris.

He has also written criticism and reportage for a wide range of publications, among them The New York Times, Slate, Rolling Stone, GQ, and Vanity Fair.  His essays have appeared in Granta, and Tin House, among others.

He has collaborated with the photographer Jack Pierson on a small book called Real Gone (published by Artspace Books in 1993), and with Cecily Brown on the book The English Garden, (KARMA, 2015).

He currently lives in Austin, Texas.

References

External links
 Published writings
  More published writings
  Selected writings in The New York Times
 li

Living people
1963 births
20th-century American novelists
21st-century American novelists
American male novelists
20th-century American male writers
21st-century American male writers